Attack poodle is a political epithet or pejorative that typically denotes a vociferous but utterly servile defender of a given political leader, party, or faction. It gained popular currency in 2002 when Paul Marsden a member of the British Parliament who ran afoul of the Labour party Chief Whip Hilary Armstrong charged that Prime Minister Tony Blair was setting out "one of his attack poodles" to bring him or her into line. It is a partly facetious expression that has been used in British and American politics, equivalent in meaning to a party hack.

The term was further popularized by the American culture critic James Wolcott in his 2004 book, Attack Poodles and Other Media Mutants: The Looting of the News in a Time of Terror, a critique of popular right-wing TV news personalities who he claims are increasingly dominating the mainstream media in America.

The term was also used in 1998 by Saddam Hussein's regime in Iraq which scorned the British as "America’s attack poodle" in response to air raids undertaken by the latter as part of Operation Desert Fox.

References 

Political terminology